Eric Alfasi (July 1, 1972 – September 22, 2021) was an Israeli professional basketball coach and a professional basketball player. He was the head coach of Hapoel Eilat of the Israeli Premier League.

Biography

As a basketball player
In his youth he was a basketball player. He played for the team Maccabi Netanya. He also played a number of seasons in the senior side of the team. He retired in his late 20s.

As a coach
In 2002 he began to coach the youth team of Maccabi Netanya and in 2008 he made his debut as a senior coach as Ironi Ashkelon appointed him as their head coach.

After an unsuccessful season with Ashkelon he made his return to Netanya, this time coaching the senior local team. In his first season with the team he won the Liga Leumit with a record of 33 wins and only 1 defeat. In his second season with the team he led them to the 2009–10 Israeli Final Four where they lost to Maccabi Tel Aviv and finished 4th. In his third season he led the team to the Israeli Basketball State Cup 2010–11 finals where they again lost to Tel Aviv.

In July 2011 he made his way back to Ironi Ashkelon as he signed a contract for one season. On December 23, 2013, it was announced that he would replace Nati Cohen. After one season he signed on to coach Ironi Nahariya.

On June 21, 2019, Alfasi was named Hapoel Eilat head coach, signing a two-year deal.

Death
Alfasi died after being hospitalized with COVID-19 on September 22, 2021, during the COVID-19 pandemic in Israel. He was 49 years old.

Honours
Domestic Cup:
Runner-up (1): 2010-11
Liga Leumit:
Champion (1): 2008-09
Regular season champion (1): 2008-09
Israeli Basketball Super League Manager of the Month (1):
October 2011

References

1972 births
2021 deaths
Israeli men's basketball players
Barak Netanya B.C. players
Israeli Jews
Israeli basketball coaches
Ironi Ashkelon coaches
Barak Netanya B.C. coaches
Maccabi Ashdod B.C. coaches
Ironi Nahariya coaches
Hapoel Eilat B.C. coaches
Elitzur Eito Ashkelon coaches
Jewish men's basketball players
Sportspeople from Netanya
Deaths from the COVID-19 pandemic in Israel